Kotharia may refer to the following places in India :

 Kotharia, Rajasthan, a town in Rajsamand district
 Kotharia Jagir, a former feudal estate in Udaipur State, with seat in the above town
 Kotharia, Rajkot, a town in Rajkot district of Gujarat
 Kotharia State, a former princely state with seat in the above town